Pearl Jam Twenty (also known as PJ20) is a live compilation album by American alternative rock band Pearl Jam and is the soundtrack to the film of the same name. It was released on September 19, 2011 in Europe and September 20 in the United States.

Track listing
Disc one

Disc two

Chart positions

References

External links

2011 live albums
2011 soundtrack albums
Pearl Jam live albums
Documentary film soundtracks
Columbia Records live albums
Columbia Records soundtracks